Queven da Silva Inácio (born 21 November 1998), commonly known as Queven, is a Brazilian footballer who plays as a midfielder.

Career statistics

Club

Notes

References

1998 births
Living people
Brazilian footballers
Association football midfielders
Super League Greece players
Football League (Greece) players
Tanabi Esporte Clube players
Mirassol Futebol Clube players
PAE Kerkyra players
Atlético Monte Azul players